Diethard Hellmann (28 December 1928 – 14 October 1999) was a German Kantor and an academic in Leipzig, Mainz and Munich.

Professional career
Born in Grimma, Dietmann Hellmann was a member of the Thomanerchor. He studied church music in Leipzig with Günther Ramin. Hellmann was the organist for early recordings of Bach cantatas by Ramin. He was Kantor at the Friedenskirche in Leipzig from 1948 to 1955. At the same time, he was a teacher for organ at the Musikhochschule Leipzig, conducting the choir of the Hochschule, and until 1951, a teacher at the Fürstenschule in Grimma. In 1950, he won a prize for organ at the first International Bach Competition. He started teaching choral conducting in 1952 and was appointed vice director of the department for church music in 1954.

In 1955, he became Kantor of the Christuskirche in Mainz, where he conducted the Kantorei, which in 1965, was named the Bachchor . In November 1955, he performed a concert of Bach cantatas. In 1958, he was awarded a prize by German broadcaster Südwestfunk (SWF) for his composition Musik auf Christi Himmelfahrt (Music for Ascension).

Hellmann was a teacher for Protestant church music at the Peter Cornelius Conservatory of Mainz, and from 1963, at the Johannes Gutenberg-Universität Mainz as well. He published sheet music, including reconstructions of Bach's Ärgre dich, o Seele, nicht, BWV 186a for the Third Sunday in Advent, Singet dem Herrn ein neues Lied, BWV 190 and the St Mark Passion.

Hellmann took the Bachchor on concert tours to France, Poland and Israel. He collaborated with singers such as Peter Schreier, Aldo Baldin, Ria Bollen, Ursula Buckel, Eva Csapó, Agnes Giebel, Julia Hamari, Ernst Haefliger, Philippe Huttenlocher, Georg Jelden, Helena Jungwirth, Siegfried Lorenz, Adalbert Kraus, Horst Laubenthal, Karl Markus, Barbara Martig-Tüller, Friedreich Melzer, Klaus Mertens, Siegmund Nimsgern, Ernst Gerold Schramm, Verena Schweizer, Jakob Stämpfli, Ortrun Wenkel, Kurt Widmer and Edith Wiens. They recorded more than 100 Bach cantatas, broadcast by SWF once a week.

Hellmann conducted the Requiem of Jean Gilles, Haydn's Harmoniemesse, the Oratorio de Noël of Saint-Saëns, Beethoven's Missa Solemnis, the four Choralkantaten of Max Reger, and Frank Martin's Golgotha.

In 1974, he was appointed professor at the Musikhochschule München, where he was the director from 1981 to 1988. Among his students were Gabriel Dessauer and Pierre Even.

Hellmann died in 1999 in Deisenhofen. In a memorial service in the Christuskirche, the Bachchor performed Bach's Es erhub sich ein Streit, BWV 19, because Hellmann had loved the tenor aria Bleibt, ihr Engel, bleibt bei mir! (Stay, ye angels, stay with me).

Selected recordings 
 Bach / Pergolesi: Psalm 51 (Kurrende 1966)
 Camille Saint-Saëns: Oratorio de Noël (recorded by SWF in 1976)
 Bruckner: motets, Kodály: Laudes organi, Hedwig Bilgram, organ (1979)
 Mozart: Vesperae de Dominica (1980)
 Reger: Choralkantaten (1980, later CD)
 Chorales and Choruses from Bach's Christmas Oratorio (1980)
 Haydn: Harmoniemesse (LP 1981)
 Bach: St Mark Passion (1983)

References

External links 
 Diethard Hellmann (Conductor, Organ) bach-cantatas.com
 Diethard Hellmann & Bach-Chor & Bach-Orchester Mainz / Bach Cantatas & Other Vocal Works bach-cantatas.com

1928 births
1999 deaths
20th-century German conductors (music)
20th-century organists
20th-century German male musicians
German choral conductors
German male conductors (music)
German classical organists
German male organists
Academic staff of Johannes Gutenberg University Mainz
Academic staff of the University of Music and Theatre Leipzig
Academic staff of the University of Music and Performing Arts Munich
Officers Crosses of the Order of Merit of the Federal Republic of Germany
Male classical organists